A list of notable religious movements that had their origins in the United States or the colonies which would form the United States.

18th century 
Louisiana Voodoo (c.1720) describes a set of spiritual beliefs and practices developed from the traditions of the West and Central African diaspora in Louisiana.
Old Lights and New Lights (c.17301740) were terms first used during the First Great Awakening in British North America to describe those that supported the awakening (New Lights) and those who were skeptical of the awakening (Old Lights).
River Brethren (1770).
Methodist Episcopal Church (1783).
Universalist Church of America (1793).
Longhouse Religion (1799).

19th century 
Black church, 1790s-onward
African Union First Colored Methodist Protestant Church and Connection, 1813
African Methodist Episcopal Church, 1816
Christian Methodist Episcopal Church, 1870
National Baptist Convention, USA, Inc., 1880
Original Church of God or Sanctified Church, 1890s
Church of Christ (Holiness) U.S.A., 1896
Church of God in Christ, 1897
African Orthodox Church, 1921
Mount Sinai Holy Church of America, 1924
Church of Universal Triumph, Dominion of God, 1944
Black theology, 1966
Reformed Mennonites, 1812
various subgroups of Amish, throughout 19th and 20th centuries
American Unitarian Association, 1825
Unitarian Universalism, 1961 (consolidation of the Universalist Church and the AUA)
Latter Day Saint movement/Mormonism, 1830
New Thought Movement, 1830s-onward
Divine Science, 1888
Unity Church, 1889
Science of Mind, 1927
Adventist/Millerites, 1840s
Seventh-day Adventist Church, 1863
Spiritualism, 1840s
Christadelphians 1848
Jehovah's Witnesses, 1870 (1931)
Old Order Mennonites, c.1872
The Theosophical Society (Eastern Theosophy), 1875
Ethical Culture, 1877 onward
Church of Christ, Scientist (Christian Science), 1879
Indian Shaker Church, 1881
Black Hebrew Israelites, 1886
Ghost Dance, 1889
Native American Church, 1890s
Polish National Catholic Church, 1897
Two By Two's, 1897

20th century 
Pentecostalism
Azusa Street Revival, 1906
Pentecostal denominations in North America
The Rosicrucian Fellowship (Esoteric Christianity, Western Theosophy, Western mystery tradition), 1909 (1313)
Moorish Science Temple of America, 1913
Reconstructionist Judaism, 1920s
Jewish Renewal, 1960s
Nation of Islam, founded in Detroit, Michigan by Wallace Fard Muhammad in July 1930
Spiritual Christian (Dukh-i-zhizniki), 1928
Huna (New Age),1936 
Scientology, 1954
Peoples Temple, 1955
Branch Davidians, 1955
Universal Life Church, 1959
Discordianism, 1963
Reformed Druids of North America, 1963
Moorish Orthodox Church of America, 1964
Eckankar, 1965
Church of Satan (LaVeyan Satanism), 1966
Universal Eclectic Wicca, 1969
Georgian Wicca, 1970
Church of the SubGenius, 1970s
Dianic Wicca, 1970s
Kemetism, 1970s
Heaven's Gate, 1970s
The Creativity Movement, 1973
Jews for Jesus, 1973
Ausar Auset Society, 1973
Kemetic Orthodoxy, 1988
Endeavor Academy (Course in Miracles), 1992
Dudeism, 1998

21st century

Church of the Flying Spaghetti Monster, 2005
The Genesis II Church of Health and Healing, either 2009 or 2010
Our Lady of Perpetual Exemption, 2015

See also

 Baptists
 Born again
 Calvinism
 Christian fundamentalism
 Christian revival
 Deism
 Dispensationalism
 Evangelicalism
 Mainline Protestant
 Methodism
 Religion and politics in the United States
 Religion in the United States
 Religious history of the United States
 Restoration Movement
 Utopian movements

References

Notes

References

Bibliography
 Hall, D. D. (2019). The Puritans: A transatlantic history. Princeton: Princeton University Press.
 Koester, N. (2015). Introduction to the history of Christianity in the United States: Revised and expanded. London: Fortress Press.
 Noll, M. (2019). A history of Christianity in the United States and Canada (2nd ed.). New York: William B. Eerdmans Publishing Company.

External links

 History of religion in the United States
Religious movements